Sugar Harvest is a 1958 Argentine film directed by Lucas Demare. It was entered into the 1959 Cannes Film Festival.

Cast
 Ariel Absalón
 Alfredo Alcón
 Graciela Borges
 José De Angelis
 Enrique Fava
 Domingo Garibotto
 Pedro Laxalt
 Luis Medina Castro
 Iris Portillo
 Romualdo Quiroga
 Félix Rivero
 Martha Roldán
 Rafael Salvatore
 Atahualpa Yupanqui
 Rossana Zucker

References

External links

1958 films
Argentine romantic drama films
1950s Spanish-language films
Films directed by Lucas Demare
1950s Argentine films